Tally Ho is a gaff-rigged cutter yacht designed by the artist and yacht designer Albert Strange. The  yacht was built at Shoreham-by-Sea, West Sussex in England and has previously carried the names Betty, Alciope, and Escape. In 2017, the Albert Strange Association, then owners of the boat, sold it to an English boatbuilder to be completely refit.

History
Albert Strange is best known for the canoe yawl with a double-ended or canoe-stern hull and the two masts of the yawl rig. However, Strange designed Tally Ho with a transom stern and a cutter rig, which was an unusual design for him. Originally named Betty, the boat was built in 1910 in Shoreham-by-Sea, West Sussex, England, by Stow & Son. The boat was built for Charles Hellyer of Brixham, Devon, England, for relaxed cruising and deep-sea fishing. In 1913, Hellyer commissioned the larger Betty II and sold Betty. After two other owners and a name change to Alciope, ownership of the boat passed in 1927 to the then Lord Stalbridge, who renamed her Tally Ho.

Tally Ho was one of only two yachts from the fifteen starters to complete the 1927 Fastnet Race. The yacht crossed the finish under heavy conditions, 52 minutes after the John G. Alden–designed 30-ton schooner La Goleta, but won the race on corrected time.

While still based in Southampton until the 1960s, Tally Ho made multiple transatlantic crossings. In 1967, Jim Louden of New Zealand embarked on Tally Ho, heading home via the Panama Canal. While heaving to at Manuae waiting for daylight, the boat drifted onto the coral reef near the island, stoving in the port side, grounding her on the reef. While being floated with empty oil drums, Tally Ho rolled over, and in the process lost her mast, bowsprit, and rudder. Still, the boat was able to stay afloat long enough to be towed back to Rarotonga to be rebuilt.

After some years, she worked as a fishing boat out of the Port of Brookings Harbor, Oregon, until 1987, under the name Escape. From 2010 until 2017 the yacht was kept on stands in a boatyard in Brookings-Harbor by the Albert Strange Society.

2017 restoration 
Until 2017, the Albert Strange Association owned the boat and had planned to restore and refit it. The hope was to eventually facilitate its return to the United Kingdom. Facing difficulties in their refit plans, in June 2017, the Association sold Tally Ho to English boatbuilder and sailor Leo Sampson Goolden for $1. He moved the boat to Sequim, Washington for restoration. Goolden has gained media attention for his videos of the restoration which he publishes at the Sampson Boat Co. YouTube channel.

In 2021, Clallam County required Goolden to apply for a conditional use permit, as the location where the boat restoration work was taking place was not zoned for that activity. Goolden settled the dispute with the county, and agreed to move the boat before September 18, 2021. In July 2021, Goolden's Sampson Boat Company and Tally Ho relocated to the nearby Port of Port Townsend, Washington, boatyard to complete the restoration there.

References

External links 
 Sampson Boat Co. – Official website of the restoration project
 Sampson Boat Co. (YouTube channel)
 Yacht Tally Ho – former official site, by the Albert Strange Association
 Albert Strange Association

Fastnet Race yachts
Individual sailing vessels
1900s sailing yachts